Dizhou or Di Prefecture was a zhou (prefecture) in imperial China centering on modern Huimin County, Shandong, China. It existed (intermittently) from 586 to 1373, after which it was renamed to Le'an Prefecture.

Geography
The administrative region of Dizhou in the Tang dynasty is in modern northern Shandong. It probably includes modern:
Under the administration of Binzhou:
Binzhou 
Huimin County
Yangxin County
Under the administration of Dongying:
Lijin County
Under the administration of Jinan:
Shanghe County

See also
Bohai Commandery
Le'an Prefecture

References
 

Prefectures of the Sui dynasty
Prefectures of the Tang dynasty
Prefectures of the Song dynasty
Former prefectures in Shandong
Prefectures of Later Tang
Prefectures of Later Zhou
Prefectures of Later Jin (Five Dynasties)
Prefectures of Later Han (Five Dynasties)
Prefectures of Later Liang (Five Dynasties)
Prefectures of the Jin dynasty (1115–1234)
Prefectures of the Yuan dynasty
Subprefectures of the Ming dynasty